The 1839 Maine gubernatorial election took place on September 9, 1839. Incumbent Democratic Governor John Fairfield defeated Whig candidate and former Governor Edward Kent in a re-match of the previous year's election.

Results

Notes

References

Gubernatorial
1839
Maine
September 1839 events